Carl D. Melton (October 14, 1927 – August 17, 2016) was an American attorney, judge, and politician.

Early life and education 
A native of Henderson, Kentucky, Melton served in the United States Army Air Forces during World War II. In 1951, he received his law degree from the University of Louisville School of Law.

Career 
Melton worked as a commonwealth's attorney and county attorney. Melton was also a member of the Kentucky House of Representatives from 1954 to 1956 as a Democrat. He later served as a judge on the Kentucky Circuit Court.

Death 
Melton died at Baptist Health Louisville in Louisville, Kentucky.

Notes

1927 births
2016 deaths
People from Henderson, Kentucky
United States Army Air Forces soldiers
Military personnel from Kentucky
University of Louisville School of Law alumni
Kentucky Commonwealth's Attorneys
Kentucky state court judges
Democratic Party members of the Kentucky House of Representatives
20th-century American judges